Elections to Newcastle-under-Lyme Borough Council were held on 10 June 2004.  One third of the council was up for election and the Labour Party gained overall control of the council from no overall control.

After the election, the composition of the council was:
Labour 31
Conservative 14
Liberal Democrat 14
Caring Party 1

Election result

Ward results

References
2004 Newcastle-under-Lyme election result

2004
2004 English local elections
2000s in Staffordshire